Donauparkstadion is a  stadium in Lustenau, a quarter of the city of Linz, Austria.  It is currently used for football matches and is the home ground of Blau-Weiß Linz.  The stadium holds 2000 people.

History
The original name was Tabak-Sportplatz, who was built in 1935 as homeground of  SV Austria Tabak Linz. It was renamed Donauparkstadion on August 1, 1997 after the fusion of SV Austria Tabak and FC Linz to FC Blau-Weiß Linz. It has 2,000 seats, of which about 400 are seats..  Until FC Blau-Weiß Linz was promoted to the first league in 2011, the Donauparkstadion served as their home ground. Since then it has been used as a training facility for the first team and as a venue for the club's amateur team. Currently FC Blau-Weiß Linz plays in the Gugl Stadium.

FC Blau-Weiß Linz will return from the Linz stadium to the Donauparkstadion. Before the move, the stadium in the Donaupark is to be renovated and in future it will offer space for 4,000 to 6,000 spectators. The renovation will start in summer 2021. The state of Upper Austria will support the project financially.

References

Football venues in Austria
Buildings and structures in Linz
Sports venues in Upper Austria
FC Blau-Weiß Linz